Hu Lien (October 1, 1907–June 22, 1977) was a Republic of China Army general. His career spanned the Northern Expedition, the Encirclement Campaigns, Second Sino-Japanese War the and the Chinese Civil War.

Early life 
Hu was born on Hua County (now Huazhou District), Shaanxi in 1907.  He studied at the Whampoa Military Academy, and graduated alongside Lin Biao in 1925.

Second Sino-Japanese War 
Hu was a regiment commander in the 11th division during the Battle of Shanghai. He was wounded several times (including a shot through the jaw) and was promoted to division commander after the Chinese defeat. As part of their proposed Sichuan invasion plan, the Imperial Japanese Army attacked Western Hubei, hoping to destroy Chiang Kai-Shek's last remaining power base. Under Hu's command, the newly formed 18th Corps repulsed the Japanese attack. Afterwards, he was awarded with the Order of Blue Sky and White Sun for his actions.

Chinese Civil War 
Following the end  of the Second Sino-Japanese War, the alliance between the Communist Party of China and the Kuomintang quickly fell apart, and the Chinese Civil War quickly resumed. As a result of Hu's military record, his unit was deployed around Central and Eastern China as a firefighting brigade against the Chinese Communists. His campaigns were successful in defeating the communist forces, defeating communist commanders such as Liu Bocheng and Su Yu. Before the Huaihai Campaign in 1948, Hu's father died and he had dental problems, and thus was absent from the military front. When the 12th Army Group was surrounded by the communist troops in Anhui, Hu was flown in a small airplane to the battlefield, and personally led a rescue mission and breakout from the encirclement with the remnant of his troops. After a week of retreat , he reached Nanjing and Chiang Kai-Shek tasked him with reorganizing the 12th Army Group. He had twice been appointed as commander of the Kinmen Defense Command, and defeated the People's Liberation Army forces sent to attack Kinmen during the Battle of Guningtou. Hu was also a Nationalist Commander during the Battle of Nanri Island, and the Second Taiwan Strait Crisis.

Career in Taiwan 

In Taiwan, Hu played a major role in Taiwan–Vietnam relations, serving as the ambassador to South Vietnam in Saigon from 1964 to 1972, and surviving multiple attempts on his life, such as the 1967 Saigon Chinese embassy bombing. His appointment to the Republic of Vietnam was part of the Republic of China's policy of sharing its expertise in anti-communist affairs with other countries in the region.
Chiang Kai-shek had deep faith in his military leadership and gave a sword with inlaid jewels to Hu. He was promoted to four-star general in 1975 after nearly fifty years of army service. Hu died from a heart attack in 1977 and was buried in Kinmen, the same island where he had defeated communist forces in 1949 and 1958.

References

1907 births
1977 deaths
Ambassadors of the Republic of China
Ambassadors to South Vietnam
Chinese anti-communists
People of the Northern Expedition
People of the Central Plains War
Chinese military personnel of World War II
Chinese people of World War II
National Revolutionary Army generals from Shaanxi
People from Weinan
Recipients of the Order of Blue Sky and White Sun
Whampoa Military Academy alumni
Taiwanese people from Shaanxi
Deaths from heart disease
Burials at sea